Newtown Flicks Short Film Festival is held annually in and around the Sydney suburb of Newtown, Australia. It was established as a non-profit organization in 2006.

The festival was created by Martin Kelly, Bill Jordan and Spiros Hristias while the three worked as equipment operators in the bio box of New Theatre, a live performance venue in Newtown. Meeting in local cafes, the creators developed the festival's name and logo, its aim (to support emerging filmmakers and showcase their works) and awards categories. 

After setting up the enterprise with their own money Kelly, Jordan and Spiros looked for outside sponsorship for the festival. Since 2006, the festival's major sponsor has been JVC Professional, donors of filmmaking equipment. As a result, the JVC Encouragement Award is presented to a filmmaker showing potential not yet fully realised. Cash prizes are offered in the other categories together with bags for audio-visual accessories made by Crumpler and statuettes made by a local arts collective.

Over the years Newtown Flicks has received grants from City of Sydney and Screen NSW. It became a national film festival for Australia in 2009. Past judges at Newtown Flicks have included critic Garry Maddox, writer Phillip Gwynne, stuntman Grant Page and actors Mark Lee and Genevieve Lemon. Design of the statuettes and posters changes with each festival.

2006 Festival
Held at the New Theatre between 15–17 April

 Winners

2007 Festival
Held at the Newtown Theatre between 30 March - 1 May

Winners

2008 Festival
Held at the Pact Theatre between 20 May – 1 June

	 Winners

2009 Festival
In May 2009 Newtown Flicks Short Film Festival returned to the New Theatre, where the judging panel was led by twice Academy Award-nominated director Bruce Beresford.

	 Winners

2010 Festival
In June 2010 Newtown Flicks Short Film Festival landed at the Pact Theater, where the judging panel was led by twice Academy Award-nominated director Bruce Beresford.

	 Winners

Notable Participants
In addition to showcasing the future of the Australian film industry, the following industry personalities have been involved with Newtown Flicks :

•	Bruce Beresford - director (Driving Miss Daisy, Puberty Blues, Double Jeopardy, Mao's Last Dancer)

•	Mark Lee -  actor (Gallipoli, Sahara)

•	Grant Page -  stuntman (Mad Max, The Pact)

•	Genevieve Lemon -  actor/singer (The Piano, Holy Smoke!, Billy Elliot)

External links
Newtown Flicks website

Film festivals in Sydney
Short film festivals in Australia